The 2008 NAWIRA Women's Rugby Championship was hosted by Guyana from the 5th to the 10th of April at Georgetown. Trinidad and Tobago reclaimed the Caribbean title.

Table

Results

Day 1

Day 2

Day 3

References 

Women's rugby union competitions for national teams
Rugby union competitions in North America
Rugby union competitions in the Caribbean
Women's rugby union in North America